Modara, also known as Mutwal (anglicised version), is a municipal ward of Colombo, capital of Sri Lanka. The mouth of the river Kelani Ganga also lies nearby. It is part of the postal area Colombo 15.

See also
 Rock House Army Camp

References

Populated places in Western Province, Sri Lanka